Angus Macdonald, Angus MacDonald, or Angus McDonald may refer to:

Chiefs of Clan Donald and its Septs
 Aonghus Mór (died  1293), first chief of Clan Donald
 Aonghus Óg of Islay (died 1314×1318/c.1330), son of the above, chief of Clan Donald
 Aonghas Óg (died 1490), last Lord of the Isles
 Angus MacDonald, 8th of Dunnyveg (died 1614), chief of Clan MacDonald of Dunnyveg

Military
 Angus McDonald (Virginia militiaman) (1727–1778), Scottish American military officer, frontiersman, and sheriff in Virginia, U.S.
 Angus McDonald (United States Army major) (1769–1814), American military officer and planter in Virginia, U.S.
 Angus William McDonald (1799–1864), American military officer and lawyer in Virginia, U.S.

Politics

Canada 
 Angus Peter McDonald (1813–1889), Canadian Conservative MP for Middlesex West
 Angus McDonald (politician) (1867–1926), Canadian independent MP for Timiskaming
 Angus Lewis Macdonald (1890–1954), Canadian liberal MP for Kingston, and Premier of Nova Scotia
 Angus Claude Macdonell (1861–1924), Canadian conservative MP for Toronto South
 Angus Ronald Macdonald (1901–1970), Canadian conservative MP for Antigonish—Guysborough
 Angus J. McDonald (1848–?), merchant and political figure in Nova Scotia

Other countries 
 Gus Macdonald (born 1940), Scottish member of the House of Lords
 Angus Wheeler McDonald, American candidate for the Democratic Party Presidential nomination 1992
 Angus MacDonald (politician) (born 1963), Member of the Scottish Parliament

Sports
 Angus McDonald (footballer) (1890–1953), Australian rules footballer
 Monk McDonald (Angus McDonald, 1901–1977), American college athlete
 Angus Macdonald (rugby union) (born 1981), New Zealand rugby player
 Angus MacDonald (footballer) (born 1992), English football player

Others
 Angus Macdonald (obstetrician) (1836–1886), Scottish physician and lecturer
 Angus MacDonald (bishop) (1844–1900), Roman Catholic Archbishop of St Andrews and Edinburgh
 Angus Daniel McDonald (1878–1941), president of the Southern Pacific Company
 Angus Snead Macdonald (fl. 1915–1962), American librarian
 Angus MacDonald (born 1950), Scottish piper
 Angus McDonald (artist) (born 1961), Australian painter
 Angus McDonald, songwriter and co-founder of Australian group Sneaky Sound System